Aramby Ibragimovich Emizh (born February 9, 1953) is a Russian judoka who competed for the Soviet Union in the 1980 Summer Olympics.

In 1980 he won the bronze medal in the extra lightweight class.

External links
profile

1953 births
Living people
Russian male judoka
Soviet male judoka
Olympic judoka of the Soviet Union
Judoka at the 1980 Summer Olympics
Olympic bronze medalists for the Soviet Union
Olympic medalists in judo
Medalists at the 1980 Summer Olympics